Clinton Township is a township in Divide County, North Dakota, United States.

External links
Information on the township www.city-data.com

Townships in Divide County, North Dakota